the 2012 Kuwait Super Cup was between league champions Qadsia SC and Crown prince cup champions Al-Arabi SC. This was the first super cup to be between the kuwaiti Classico Clubs, though Al-Arabi Won and set the record of being 100% wins in the Super cup.

References

External links
Kuwait League Fixtures and Results at FIFA
Kuwaiti Super Cup (Arabic)
xscores.com Kuwait 
goalzz.com - Super Cup
RSSSF.com - Kuwait - List of Champions

Super Cup
Kuwait Super Cup